Stoning, or lapidation, is a method of capital punishment where a group throws stones at a person until the subject dies from blunt trauma. It has been attested as a form of punishment for grave misdeeds since ancient times.

The Torah and Talmud prescribe stoning as punishment for a number of offenses. Over the centuries, Rabbinic Judaism developed a number of procedural constraints which made these laws practically unenforceable. Although stoning is not mentioned in the Quran, classical Islamic jurisprudence (fiqh) imposed stoning as a hadd (sharia-prescribed) punishment for certain forms of zina (illicit sexual intercourse) on the basis of hadith (sayings and actions attributed to the Islamic prophet Muhammad). It also developed a number of procedural requirements which made zina difficult to prove in practice.

Stoning appears to have been the standard method of capital punishment in ancient Israel. Its use is attested in the early Christian era, but Jewish courts generally avoided stoning sentences in later times. Only a few isolated instances of legal stoning are recorded in pre-modern history of the Islamic world. Criminal laws of most modern Muslim-majority countries have been derived from Western models. In recent decades several states have inserted stoning and other hudud (pl. of hadd) punishments into their penal codes under the influence of Islamist movements. These laws hold particular importance for religious conservatives due to their scriptural origin, though in practice they have played a largely symbolic role and tended to fall into disuse.

In recent times, stoning has been a legal or customary punishment in Iran, United Arab Emirates, Qatar, Mauritania, Saudi Arabia, Sudan, Yemen, northern Nigeria, Afghanistan, Brunei, and tribal parts of Pakistan, including northwest Kurram Valley and the northwest Khwezai-Baezai region though it is rarely carried out. In some of these countries, including Afghanistan, where stoning is not legal, it has been carried out extrajudicially by militants, tribal leaders, and others. In some other countries, including Nigeria and Pakistan, although stoning is a legal form of punishment, it has never been legally carried out. Stoning is condemned by human rights organizations. Punishing adultery with stoning has varying levels of public support in the Muslim world, ranging from 86% of Muslims in Pakistan to 6% of Muslims in Albania and Bosnia.

Religious scripture and law

Judaism

Torah
The Jewish Torah (the first five books of the Hebrew Bible: Genesis, Exodus, Leviticus, Numbers, and Deuteronomy) serves as a common religious reference for Judaism. Stoning is the method of execution mentioned most frequently in the Torah. (Murder is not mentioned as an offense punishable by stoning, but it seems that a member of the victim's family was allowed to kill the murderer; see avenger of blood.) The crimes punishable by stoning were the following:
 Touching Mount Sinai while God was giving Moses the Ten Commandments, 
 An ox that gores someone to death should be stoned, 
 Breaking Sabbath, –36
 Giving one's "offspring"  "to Molech" 
 Having a "familiar spirit" (or being a necromancer) or being a "wizard", 
 Attempting to convert people to other faiths, –11
 Cursing God, –16
 Engaging in idolatry, Deuteronomy 17:2–7; or seducing others to do so, –12
 "Rebellion" against parents .
 A bride presenting as a virgin, then found to have willfully engaged in sexual intercourse with a strange man while a betrothed damsel –21
 Sexual intercourse between a man and a woman engaged to another man in a town, since she did not cry out, ; both parties should be stoned to death.
 Forced sexual intercourse between a man and a woman engaged to another man in a field, where no one could hear her cries and save her, ; the man should be stoned.

Describing the stoning of those who entice others to apostatize from Judaism, the Torah states:

A case noted in the Bible, not falling into any of the above categories, was that of Achan, stoned to death together with his sheep, other livestock and his children for having pillaged valuables from Jericho during Joshua's Conquest of Canaan.

Mishna
The Talmud describes four methods of execution: stoning, pouring molten lead down the throat of the condemned person, beheading, and strangulation (see Capital and corporal punishment in Judaism). The Mishna gives the following list of persons who should be stoned.

"To the following sinners stoning applies – אלו הן הנסקלין
 one who has had relations with his mother – הבא על האם
 with his father's wife – ועל אשת האב
 with his daughter-in-law – ועל הכלה
 a human male with a human male – ועל הזכור
 or with cattle – ועל הבהמה
 and the same is the case with a woman who uncovers herself before cattle – והאשה המביאה את הבהמה
 with a blasphemer – והמגדף
 an idolater – והעובד עבודת כוכבים
 he who sacrifices one of his children to Molech – והנותן מזרעו למולך
 one that occupies himself with familiar spirits – ובעל אוב
 a wizard – וידעוני
 one who violates Sabbath – והמחלל את השבת
 one who curses his father or mother – והמקלל אביו ואמו
 one who has assaulted a betrothed damsel – והבא על נערה המאורסה
 a seducer who has seduced men to worship idols – והמסית
 and the one who misleads a whole town – והמדיח
 a witch (male or female) – והמכשף
 a stubborn and rebellious son – ובן סורר ומורה"

As God alone was deemed to be the only arbiter in the use of capital punishment, not fallible people, the Sanhedrin made stoning a hypothetical upper limit on the severity of punishment.

Prior to early Christianity, particularly in the Mishnah, doubts were growing in Jewish society about the effectiveness of capital punishment in general (and stoning in particular) in acting as a useful deterrent. Subsequently, its use was dissuaded by the central legislators. The Mishnah states:

A Sanhedrin that puts a man to death once in seven years is called destructive. Rabbi Eliezer ben Azariah says that this extends to a Sanhedrin that puts a man to death even once in seventy years. Rabbi Akiba and Rabbi Tarfon say: Had we been in the Sanhedrin none would ever have been put to death. Rabban Simeon ben Gamaliel says: they would have multiplied shedders of blood in Israel.

In the following centuries the leading Jewish sages imposed so many restrictions on the implementation of capital punishment as to make it de facto illegal. The restrictions were to prevent execution of the innocent, and included many conditions for a testimony to be admissible that were difficult to fulfill.

Philosopher Moses Maimonides wrote, "It is better and more satisfactory to acquit a thousand guilty persons than to put a single innocent one to death." He was concerned that the law guard its public perception, to preserve its majesty and retain the people's respect. He saw errors of commission as much more threatening to the integrity of law than errors of omission.

Mode of judgment
In rabbinic law, capital punishment may be inflicted by only the verdict of a regularly constituted court of twenty-three qualified members. There must be the most trustworthy and convincing testimony of at least two qualified eyewitnesses to the crime, who must also depose that the culprit had been forewarned of the criminality and the consequences of his project. The culprit must be a person of legal age and of sound mind, and the crime must be proved to have been committed of the culprit's free will and without the aid of others.

On the day the verdict is pronounced, the convict is led forth to execution. The Torah law (Leviticus 19:18) prescribes, "Thou shalt love thy neighbor as thyself"; and the Rabbis maintain that this love must be extended beyond the limits of social intercourse in life, and applied even to the convicted criminal who, "though a sinner, is still thy brother" (Mak. 3:15; Sanh. 44a): "The spirit of love must be manifested by according him a decent death" (Sanh. 45a, 52a). Torah law provides (Deut. 24:16), "The parents shall not be put to death for the children, neither shall the children be put to death for the parents; every man shall be put to death for his own sins", and rabbinic jurisprudence follows this principle both to the letter and in spirit. A sentence is not attended by confiscation of the convict's goods; the person's possessions descend to their legal heirs.

The Talmud limits the use of the death penalty to Jewish criminals who:
 (A) while about to do the crime were warned not to commit the crime while in the presence of two witnesses (and only individuals who meet a strict list of standards are considered acceptable witnesses); and
 (B) having been warned, committed the crime in front of the same two witnesses.

In theory, the Talmudic method of how stoning is to be carried out differs from mob stoning. According to the Jewish oral law, after the Jewish criminal has been determined as guilty before the Great Sanhedrin, the two valid witnesses and the sentenced criminal go to the edge of a two-story building. From there the two witnesses are to push the criminal off the roof of a two-story building. The two-story height is chosen as this height is estimated by the Talmud to effect a quick and painless demise but is not so high that the body will become dismembered. After the criminal has fallen, the two witnesses are to drop a large boulder onto the criminal – requiring both of the witnesses to lift the boulder together. If the criminal did not die from the fall or from the crushing of the large boulder, then any people in the surrounding area are to quickly cause him to die by stoning with whatever rocks they can find.

Islam

Islamic sharia law is based on the Quran and the hadith as primary sources.

Quran
Stoning is not mentioned as a form of capital punishment in the canonical text of the Quran. However, Islamic scholars have traditionally postulated that there is a Quranic verse ("If a man or a woman commits adultery, stone them...") which was "abrogated" textually while retaining its legal force.

In the extant text of the Quran, the punishment for an unmarried adulterer (Zani) or adultress (Zania) is flogging:

Hadith
Stoning in the Sunnah mainly follows on the Jewish stoning rules of the Torah. A few hadiths refer to Muhammad ordering the stoning of a married Jewish man and a married woman committing an illegal sexual act after consulting the Torah.

In a few others, a Bedouin man is lashed, while a Jewish woman is stoned to death, for having sex outside marriage.

Stoning is described as punishment in multiple hadiths. Shia and Sunni hadith collections differ because scholars from the two traditions differ as to the reliability of the narrators and transmitters and the Imamah. Shi'a sayings related to stoning can be found in Kitab al-Kafi, and Sunni sayings related to stoning can be found in the Sahih Bukhari and Sahih Muslim. Based on these hadiths, in some Muslim countries, married adulterers are sentenced to death, while consensual sex between unmarried people results in 100 lashes.

Hadiths describe stoning as punishment under sharia. In others stoning is prescribed as punishment for illegal sex between man and woman, illegal sex by a slave girl, as well as anyone involved in any homosexual relations. In some sunnah, the method of stoning, by first digging a pit and partly burying the person's lower half in it, is described.

Islamic jurisprudence (fiqh)
Stoning (Arabic: رجم Rajm, sometimes spelled as Rajam) has been extensively discussed in the texts of early, medieval and modern era Islamic jurisprudence (fiqh).

According to traditional jurisprudence, zina can include adultery (of married parties), fornication (of unmarried parties), prostitution, bestiality, and rape. Classification of homosexual intercourse as zina differs according to legal school. Although stoning for zina is not mentioned in the Quran, all schools of traditional jurisprudence agreed on the basis of hadith that it is to be punished by stoning if the offender is muhsan (adult, free, Muslim, and having been married), with some extending this punishment to certain other cases and milder punishment prescribed in other scenarios. The offenders must have acted of their own free will. According to traditional jurisprudence, zina must be proved by testimony of four eyewitnesses to the actual act of penetration, or a confession repeated four times and not retracted later. The Maliki legal school also allows an unmarried woman's pregnancy to be used as evidence, but the punishment can be averted by a number of legal "semblances" (shubuhat), such as existence of an invalid marriage contract. These requirements made zina virtually impossible to prove in practice. Rape was traditionally prosecuted under different legal categories which used normal evidentiary rules. Making an accusation of zina without presenting the required eyewitnesses is called qadhf (القذف), which is itself a hadd crime liable to a punishment of 80 lashes and to be unacceptable as witnesses unless they repent and reform.

According to the Islamic concept of Li'an, the testimony of a man who accuses his own wife without any other witnesses may be accepted if he swears by God four times that he is telling the truth with a fifth oath to incur God's condemnation if they be lying. In this case, if his wife counter swears, no punishment will be enforced.

One of the widely followed Islamic legal commentaries, Al-Muwatta by Malik ibn Anas, state that contested pregnancy is sufficient proof of adultery and the woman must be stoned to death.

Hanafi
Hanafi jurists have held that the accused must be a muhsan at the time of religiously disallowed sex, to be punished by Rajm (stoning). A Muhsan is an adult, free, Muslim who has previously enjoyed legitimate sexual relations in matrimony, regardless of whether the marriage still exists. In other words, stoning does not apply to someone who was never married in his or her life (only lashing in public is the mandatory punishment in such cases).

For evidence, Hanafi fiqh accepts the following: self-confession, or testimony of four male witnesses (female witness is not acceptable). Hanafi Islamic law literature specifies two types of stoning. One, when the punishment is based on bayyina, or concrete evidence (four male witnesses). In this case the person is bound, a pit dug, the bound person placed and partially buried inside the pit so that he or she may not escape, thereafter the public stoning punishment is executed. A woman sentenced to stoning must be partially buried up to her chest. The first stones are thrown by the witnesses and the accuser, thereafter the Muslim community present, stated Abū Ḥanīfa and other Hanafi scholars. In second type of stoning, when the punishment is based on self-confession, the stoning is to be performed without digging a pit or partially burying the person. In this case, the qadi (judge) should throw the first stone before other Muslims join in. Further, if the person flees, the person is allowed to leave.

Hanafi scholars specify the stone size to be used for Rajm, to be the size of one's hand. It should not be too large to cause death too quickly, nor too small to extend only pain.

Hanafis have traditionally held that the witnesses should throw the first stones in case the conviction was brought about by witnesses, and the qadi must throw the first stones in case the conviction was brought about by a confession.

Shafi'i
The Shafii school literature has the same Islamic law analysis as the Hanafi. However, it recommends, that the first stone be thrown by the Imam or his deputy in all cases, followed by the Muslim community witnessing the stoning punishment.

Hanbali
Hanbali jurist Ibn Qudamah states, "Muslim jurists are unanimous on the fact that stoning to death is a specified punishment for the married adulterer and adulteress. The punishment is recorded in number of traditions and the practice of Muhammad stands as an authentic source supporting it. This is the view held by all Companions, Successors and other Muslim scholars with the exception of Kharijites."

Hanbali Islamic law sentences all forms of consensual but religiously illegal sex as punishable with Rajm.

Maliki
Maliki school of jurisprudence (fiqh) holds that stoning is the required punishment for illegal sex by a married or widowed person, as well as for any form of homosexual relations among men. Malik ibn Anas, founder of the Maliki fiqh, considered pregnancy in an unmarried woman as a conclusive proof of zina. He also stated that contested pregnancy is also sufficient proof of adultery and any Muslim woman who is pregnant by a man who she is not married to, at the time of getting pregnant, must be stoned to death. Later Maliki Muslim scholars admitted the concept of "sleeping embryo", where a divorced woman could escape the stoning punishment, if she remained unmarried and became pregnant anytime within five years of her divorce, and it was assumed that she was impregnated by her previous husband but the embryo remained dormant for five years.

History

Stoning is attested in the Near East since ancient times as  a form of capital punishment for grave sins. However stoning as a practice was not geographically limited to only the Near East, and there is significant historical record of stoning being employed in the west as well. The ancient geographer Pausanias describes both the elder and younger Aristocrates of Orchomenus being stoned to death in ancient Greece around the 7th century BCE.

Stoning was "presumably" the standard form of capital punishment in ancient Israel. It is attested in the Old Testament as a punishment for blasphemy, idolatry and other crimes, in which the entire community pelted the offender with stones outside a city. The death of Stephen, as reported in the New Testament (Acts 7:58) was also organized in this way. Paul was stoned and left for dead in Lystra (Acts 14:19). Josephus and Eusebius report that Pharisees stoned James, brother of Jesus, after hurling him from the pinnacle of the Temple shortly before the fall of Jerusalem in 70 CE. Historians disagree as to whether Roman authorities allowed Jewish communities to apply capital punishment to those who broke religious laws, or whether these episodes represented a form of lynching. During the Late Antiquity, the tendency of not applying the death penalty at all became predominant in Jewish courts. Where medieval Jewish courts had the power to pass and execute death sentences, they continued to do so for particularly grave offenses, although not necessarily the ones defined by the law, and they generally refrained from use of stoning.

Aside from "a few rare and isolated" instances from the pre-modern era and several recent cases, there is no historical record of stoning for zina being legally carried out in the Islamic world. In the modern era, sharia-based criminal laws have been widely replaced by statutes inspired by European models. However, the Islamic revival of the late 20th century brought along the emergence of Islamist movements calling for full implementation of sharia, including reinstatement of stoning and other hudud punishments. A number of factors have contributed to the rise of these movements, including the failure of authoritarian secular regimes to meet the expectations of their citizens, and a desire of Muslim populations to return to more culturally authentic forms of socio-political organization in the face of a perceived cultural invasion from the West. Supporters of sharia-based legal reforms felt that "Western law" had its chance to bring development and justice, and hoped that a return to Islamic law would produce better results. They also hoped that introduction of harsh penalties would put an end to crime and social problems.

In practice, Islamization campaigns have focused on a few highly visible issues associated with the conservative Muslim identity, particularly women's hijab and the hudud criminal punishments (whipping, stoning and amputation) prescribed for certain crimes. For many Islamists, hudud punishments are at the core of the divine sharia because they are specified by the letter of scripture rather than by human interpreters. Modern Islamists have often rejected, at least in theory, the stringent procedural constraints developed by classical jurists to restrict their application. Several countries, including Iran, Pakistan, Sudan, and some Nigerian states have incorporated hudud rules into their criminal justice systems, which, however, retained fundamental influences of earlier Westernizing reforms. In practice, these changes were largely symbolic, and aside from some cases brought to trial to demonstrate that the new rules were being enforced, hudud punishments tended to fall into disuse, sometimes to be revived depending on the local political climate. The supreme courts of Sudan and Iran have rarely approved verdicts of stoning or amputation, and the supreme courts of Pakistan and Nigeria have never done so.

Unlike other countries, where stoning was introduced into state law as part of recent reforms, Saudi Arabia has never adopted a criminal code and Saudi judges still follow traditional Hanbali jurisprudence. Death sentences in Saudi Arabia are pronounced almost exclusively based on the system of judicial sentencing discretion (tazir) rather than sharia-prescribed (hudud) punishments, following the classical principle that hudud penalties should be avoided if possible.

In China, stoning was one of the many methods of killing carried out during the Cultural Revolution, including the Guangxi Massacre.

Contemporary legal status and use
As of September 2010, stoning is a punishment that is included in the laws in some countries including Saudi Arabia, Sudan, Iran, Somalia, Yemen and some predominantly Muslim states in northern Nigeria as punishment for Zina ("adultery by married persons").

Afghanistan

Stoning is legal in Afghanistan with the Taliban making it legal after their takeover in 2021. Before the Taliban government, most areas of Afghanistan, aside from the capital, Kabul, were controlled by warlords or tribal leaders. The Afghan legal system depended highly on an individual community's local culture and the political or religious ideology of its leaders. Stoning also occurred in lawless areas, where vigilantes committed the act for political purposes. Once the Taliban took over, it became a form of punishment for certain serious crimes or adultery. After the fall of the Taliban government, the Karzai administration re-enforced the 1976 penal code which made no provision for the use of stoning as a punishment. In 2013, the Ministry of Justice proposed public stoning as punishment for adultery. However, the government had to back down from the proposal after it was leaked and triggered international outcry.

Aceh Territory

On 14 September 2009, the outgoing Aceh Legislative Council passed a bylaw that called for the stoning of married adulterers. However, then governor Irwandi Yusuf refused to sign the bylaw, thereby keeping it a law without legal force and, in some views, therefore still a law draft, rather than actual law. In March 2013, the Aceh government removed the stoning provision from its own draft of a new criminal code.

Brunei

Beginning on 3 April 2019, any Muslim individuals found guilty of gay sex and adultery will be stoned to death, according to a new penal code announced by Brunei. The punishment will be "witnessed by a group of Muslims." Brunei has become the first Southeast Asian country which officially adopts public stoning as a judicial form of punishment.

On 5 May, the Sultan of Brunei confirmed that the de facto moratorium (a delay or suspension of an activity or a law) on the death penalty will apply to the Sharia Penal Code and committed Brunei to ratifying the United Nations Convention Against Torture (UNCAT).

Iran

The Iranian judiciary officially placed a moratorium on stoning in 2002; however, in 2007, the Iranian judiciary confirmed that a man who had been convicted of adultery 10 years earlier, was stoned to death in Qazvin province. In 2008, the judiciary tried to eliminate the punishment from the books in legislation submitted to parliament for approval. In 2009, two people were stoned to death in Mashhad, Razavi Khorasan Province as punishment for the crime of adultery. The amended penal code, adopted in 2013, no longer contains explicit language prescribing stoning as punishment for adultery. According to legal experts, while an explicit prescription of stoning as punishment for adultery has been removed from Iran's new penal code, stoning remains a possible form of punishment, since the penal code still lists it, without specifying when it should be used, and allows punishment to be based on fiqh (traditional Islamic jurisprudence), which includes provisions for stoning. In 2013 the spokesman for the Iranian Parliament's Justice Commission confirmed that while the Penal Code no longer prescribes stoning, it remains a valid punishment under sharia, which is enforceable under the Penal Code. The most known case in Iran was the stoning of Soraya Manutchehri in 1986.

Methods

In the 2008 version of the Islamic Penal Code of Iran detailed how stoning punishments are to be carried out for adultery, and even hints in some contexts that the punishment may allow for its victims to avoid death:

Article 102 – An adulterous man shall be buried in a ditch up to near his waist and an adulterous woman up to near her chest and then stoned to death.
Article 103 – In case the person sentenced to stoning escapes the ditch in which they are buried, then if the adultery is proven by testimony then they will be returned for the punishment but if it is proven by their own confession then they will not be returned.
Article 104 – The size of the stone used in stoning shall not be too large to kill the convict by one or two throws and at the same time shall not be too small to be called a stone.

Depending upon the details of the case, the stoning may be initiated by the judge overseeing the matter or by one of the original witnesses to the adultery. Certain religious procedures may also need to be followed both before and after the implementation of a stoning execution, such as wrapping the person being stoned in traditional burial dress before the procedure.

The method of stoning set out in the 2008 code was similar to that in a 1999 version of Iran's penal code. Iran revised its penal code in 2013. The new code does not include the above passages, but does include stoning as a hadd punishment. For example, Book I, Part III, Chapter 5, Article 132 of the new Islamic Penal Code (IPC) of 2013 in the Islamic Republic of Iran states, "If a man and a woman commit zina together more than one time, if the death penalty and flogging or stoning and flogging are imposed, only the death penalty or stoning, whichever is applicable, shall be executed". Book 2, Part II, Chapter 1, Article 225 of the Iran's IPC released in 2013 states, "the hadd punishment for zina of a man and a woman who meet the conditions of ihsan shall be stoning to death".

Iraq
In 2007, Du'a Khalil Aswad, a Yazidi girl, was stoned by her fellow tribesmen in northern Iraq for dating a Muslim boy.

In 2012 at least 14 youths were stoned to death in Baghdad, apparently as part of a Shi'ite militant campaign against Western-style "emo" fashion. It was followed by condemnation by Shiite scholars.

An Iraqi man was stoned to death by IS, in August 2014, in the northern city of Mosul after one Sunni Islamic court sentenced him to die for the crime of adultery.

Nigeria
Since the sharia legal system was introduced in the predominantly Muslim north of Nigeria in 2000, more than a dozen Nigerian Muslims have been sentenced to death by stoning for sexual offences ranging from adultery to homosexuality. However, none of these sentences have actually been carried out. They have either been thrown out on appeal, commuted to prison terms or left unenforced, in part as a result of pressure from human rights groups.

Pakistan

As part of Zia-ul-Haq's Islamization measures, stoning to death (rajm) at a public place  was introduced into law via the 1979 Hudood Ordinances as punishment for adultery (zina) and rape (zina-bil-jabr) when committed by a married person. However, stoning has never been officially utilized since the law came into effect and all judicial executions occur by hanging. The first conviction and sentence of stoning (of Fehmida and Allah-Bakhsh) in September 1981 was overturned under national and international pressure. Another conviction for adultery and sentence of stoning (of Shahida Parveen and Muhammad Sarwar) in early 1988 sparked outrage and led to a retrial and acquittal by the Federal Sharia Court. In this case the trial court took the view that notice of divorce by Shahida's former husband, Khushi Muhammad, should have been given to the Chairman of the local council, as stipulated under Section-7(3) of the Muslim Family Laws Ordinance, 1961. This section states that any man who divorces his wife must register it with the Union Council. Otherwise, the court concluded that the divorce stood invalidated and the couple became liable to conviction under the Adultery ordinance. In 2006, the ordinances providing for stoning in the case of adultery or rape were legislatively demoted from overriding status.

Extrajudicial stonings in Pakistan have been known to happen in recent times. In March 2013, Pakistani soldier Anwar Din, stationed in Parachinar, was publicly stoned to death for allegedly having a love affair with a girl from a village in the country's north western Kurram Agency. On 11 July 2013, Arifa Bibi, a young mother of two, was sentenced by a tribal court in Dera Ghazi Khan District, in Punjab, to be stoned to death for possessing a cell phone. Members of her family were ordered to execute her sentence and her body was buried in the desert far away from her village.

In February 2014, a couple in a remote area of Baluchistan province was stoned to death after being accused of an adulterous relationship. On 27 May 2014, Farzana Parveen, a 25-year-old married woman who was three months pregnant, was killed by being attacked with batons and bricks by nearly 20 members of her family outside the high court of Lahore in front of "a crowd of onlookers" according to a statement by a police investigator. The assailants, who allegedly included her father and brothers, attacked Farzana and her husband Mohammad Iqbal with batons and bricks. Her father Mohammad Azeem, who was arrested for murder, reportedly called the murder an "honor killing" and said "I killed my daughter as she had insulted all of our family by marrying a man without our consent." The man whose second wife Farzana had  become, Iqbal, told a news agency that he had strangled his previous wife in order to marry Farzana, and police said that he had been released for killing his first wife because a "compromise" had been reached with his family.

Saudi Arabia

Legal stoning sentences have been reported in Saudi Arabia. There were four cases of execution by stoning reported between 1981 and 1992.

Sudan
In May 2012, a Sudanese court convicted Intisar Sharif Abdallah of adultery and sentenced her to death; the charges were appealed and dropped two months later. In July 2012, a criminal court in Khartoum, Sudan, sentenced 23-year-old Layla Ibrahim Issa Jumul to death by stoning for adultery. Amnesty International reported that she was denied legal counsel during the trial and was convicted only on the basis of her confession. The organization designated her a prisoner of conscience, "held in detention solely for consensual sexual relations", and lobbied for her release. In September, Article 126 of the 1991 Sudan Criminal Law, which provided for death by stoning for apostasy, was amended to provide for death by hanging.

In June 2022, Sudan sentenced a woman named Maryam Alsyed Tiyrab, to death by stoning, although the previous year it had ratified the UN Convention Against Torture which forbids the practice.

Somalia
In October 2008, a girl, Aisha Ibrahim Duhulow, was buried up to her neck at a Somalian football stadium, then stoned to death in front of more than 1,000 people. The stoning occurred after she had allegedly pleaded guilty to adultery in a sharia court in Kismayo, a city that was controlled by Islamist insurgents. According to the insurgents she had stated that she wanted sharia law to apply. However, other sources state that the victim had been crying, had begged for mercy and had to be forced into the hole before being buried up to her neck in the ground. Amnesty International later learned that the girl was in fact 13 years old and had been arrested by al-Shabab militia after she had reported being gang-raped by three men.

In September 2014, Somali al Shabaab militants stoned a woman to death, after she was declared guilty of adultery by an informal court.

United Arab Emirates
Stoning is a legal form of judicial punishment in UAE for adultery and homosexuality. Article 354 of the Federal Penal Code  states: "Whoever commits rape on a female or sodomy with a male shall be punished by death.", In 2006, an expatriate was sentenced to death by stoning for committing adultery. Between 2009 and 2013, several people were sentenced to death by stoning. In May 2014, an Asian housemaid was sentenced to death by stoning in Abu Dhabi.

Islamic State

Several adultery executions by stoning committed by IS were reported in the autumn of 2014. The Islamic State's magazine, Dabiq, documented the stoning of a woman in Raqqa as a punishment for adultery.

In October 2014, IS released a video appearing to show a Syrian man stone his daughter to death for alleged adultery.

Views

Support

Among Christians
The late American Calvinist and Christian Reconstructionist cleric Rousas John (R. J.) Rushdoony, his son Mark and his son-in-law Gary North, supported the reinstatement of the Mosaic law's penal sanctions. Under such a system, the list of civil crimes which carried a death sentence by stoning would include homosexuality, adultery, incest, lying about one's virginity, bestiality, witchcraft, idolatry or apostasy, public blasphemy, false prophesying, kidnapping, rape, and bearing false witness in a capital case.

Among Muslims
A survey conducted by the Pew Research Center in 2013 found varying support in the global Muslim population for stoning as a punishment for adultery (sex between people where at least one person is married; when both participants are unmarried they get 100 lashes). Highest support for stoning is found in Muslims of the Middle East-North Africa region and South-Asian countries while generally less support is found in Muslims living in the Mediterranean and Central Asian countries. Support is consistently higher  in Muslims who want Sharia to be the law of the land than in Muslims who do not want Sharia. Support for stoning in various countries is as follows:

South Asia:

Pakistan (86% in all Muslims, 89% in Muslims who say Sharia should be the law of the land), Afghanistan (84% in all Muslims, 85% in Muslims who say Sharia should be the law of the land), Bangladesh (54% in all Muslims, 55% in Muslims who say Sharia should be the law of the land)

Middle East-North Africa:

Palestinian territories (81% in all Muslims, 84% in Muslims who say Sharia should be the law of the land), Egypt (80% in all Muslims, 81% in Muslims who say Sharia should be the law of the land), Jordan (65% in all Muslims, 67% in Muslims who say Sharia should be the law of the land), Iraq (57% in all Muslims, 58% in Muslims who say Sharia should be the law of the land)

Southeast Asia:

Malaysia (54% in all Muslims, 60% in Muslims who say Sharia should be the law of the land), Indonesia (42% in all Muslims, 48% in Muslims who say Sharia should be the law of the land), Thailand (44% in all Muslims, 51% in Muslims who say Sharia should be the law of the land)

Sub-Saharan Africa:

Niger (70% in all Muslims), Djibouti (67%), Mali (58%), Senegal (58%), Guinea Bissau (54%), Tanzania (45%), Ghana (42%), DR Congo (39%), Cameroon (36%), Nigeria (33%)

Central Asia:

Kyrgyzstan (26% in all Muslims, 39% in Muslims who say Sharia should be the law of the land), Tajikistan (25% in all Muslims, 51% in Muslims who say Sharia should be the law of the land), Azerbaijan (16%), Turkey (9% in all Muslims, 29% in Muslims who say Sharia should be the law of the land)

Southern and Eastern Europe:

Russia (13% in all Muslims, 26% in Muslims who say sharia should be the law of the land), Kosovo (9% in all Muslims, 25% in Muslims who say Sharia should be the law of the land), Albania (6% in all Muslims, 25% in Muslims who say Sharia should be the law of the land), Bosnia (6% in all Muslims, 21% in Muslims who say Sharia should be the law of the land)

Places where substantial numbers of Muslims did not answer the survey's question or are undecided about whether they support stoning for adultery include Malaysia (19% of all Muslims), Kosovo (18%), Iraq (14%), Democratic Republic of the Congo (12%) and Tajikistan (10%).

Opposition
Stoning has been condemned by several human rights organizations. Some groups, such as Amnesty International and Human Rights Watch, oppose all capital punishment, including stoning. Other groups, such as RAWA (Revolutionary Association of the Women of Afghanistan), or the International Committee against Stoning (ICAS), oppose stoning per se as an especially cruel practice.

Specific sentences of stoning, such as the Amina Lawal case, have often generated international protest. Groups such as Human Rights Watch, while in sympathy with these protests, have raised a concern that the Western focus on stoning as an especially "exotic" or "barbaric" act distracts from what they view as the larger problems of capital punishment. They argue that the "more fundamental human rights issue in Nigeria is the dysfunctional justice system."

In Iran, the Stop Stoning Forever Campaign was formed by various women's rights activists after a man and a woman were stoned to death in Mashhad in May 2006. The campaign's main goal is to legally abolish stoning as a form of punishment for adultery in Iran.

Human rights
Stoning is condemned by human rights groups as a form of cruel and unusual punishment and torture, and a serious violation of human rights.

Women's rights
Stoning has been condemned as a violation of women's rights and a form of discrimination against women. Although stoning is also applied to men, the vast majority of the victims are reported to be women.
According to the international group Women Living Under Muslim Laws stoning "is one of the most brutal forms of violence perpetrated against women in order to control and punish their sexuality and basic freedoms".

Amnesty International has argued that the reasons for which women suffer disproportionately from stoning include the fact that women are not treated equally and fairly by the courts; the fact that, being more likely to be illiterate than men, women are more likely to sign confessions to crimes which they did not commit; and the fact that general discrimination against women in other life aspects leaves them at higher risk of convictions for adultery.

LGBT rights
Stoning also targets homosexuals and others who have same-sex relations in certain jurisdictions. In Mauritania, northern Nigeria, Somalia, Saudi Arabia, Brunei, the UAE, and Yemen, the legal punishment for sodomy is death by stoning.

Right to private life
Human rights organizations argue that many acts targeted by stoning should not be illegal in the first place, as outlawing them interferes with people's right to a private life. Amnesty International said that stoning deals with "acts which should never be criminalized in the first place, including consensual sexual relations between adults, and choosing one’s religion".

Examples

Ancient
 Palamedes of Greek mythology, according to some sources stoned to death as a traitor.
 Lucius Appuleius Saturninus, d. 100 BC, grandfather of later triumvir Marcus Aemilius Lepidus
 Pancras of Taormina, about AD 40
 James the Just, in AD 62, after being condemned by the Sanhedrin
 Possibly Saint Timothy (by Hellenistic pagans), after AD 67
 Constantine-Silvanus, founder of the Paulicians, stoned in 684 in Armenia
 Chase (son of Ioube), Muslim Byzantine official of Arab origin, stoned in 915 at Athens
 Saint Eskil, Anglo-Saxon monk stoned to death by Swedish Vikings, about 1080
 Moctezuma II, 1520, last Aztec Emperor (according to Western accounts; whereas, according to Aztec accounts, the Spanish killed him)

Averted
 Xenophon mentions in his Anabasis, 4th century BCE, that several people are accused and suggested stoned, but averted, including Xenophon himself

Modern
 Soraya Manutchehri, 1986, a 35-year-old woman stoned to death in Iran after unconfirmed accusations of adultery
 Mahboubeh M. and Abbas H., at Behest-e Zahra cemetery, southern Teheran, Iran, 2006. The public was not invited to the stoning, and  the incident was not reported to the media. However it was spread by word of mouth to a journalist and women's rights activist. The activist gathered information and further exposed the happening to the world. In response to this, several women's rights activists, lawyers and members of the Networks of Volunteers went on to form the Stop Stoning Forever campaign to stop stoning in Iran.
 Du’a Khalil Aswad, 2007, a 17-year-old girl stoned to death in Iraq
 Solange Medina, 2009, a 20-year-old woman stoned to death in Ciudad Juárez, Chihuahua, Mexico
 Gustavo Santoro, 2010, a small town mayor in Mexico believed to have been murdered by stoning
 Murray Seidman, 2011, a 70-year-old senior in Lansdowne, Pennsylvania, near Philadelphia, stoned to death by 28-year-old John Thomas after allegedly making sexual advances towards the younger man. Thomas' defence is that he did it because the Old Testament says to kill homosexuals in certain situations. Thomas pled guilty and was sentenced to 20–40 years imprisonment.

Averted
 Amina Lawal was sentenced to death by stoning in Nigeria in 2002 but freed on appeal.
 Sakineh Mohammadi Ashtiani was sentenced to death by stoning in Iran in 2006. Following a review the sentence was commuted and she was released in 2014.
 Safiya Husseini was sentenced to death by stoning in Nigeria but freed on appeal.
 Shaheen Abdel Rahman in Fujeirah, United Arab Emirates in 2006
 Zoleykhah Kadkhoda in Iran

Biblical
In the Tanakh (Old Testament):
 The son of an Israelite woman and an Egyptian man, for cursing God
 A man who gathered wood on Sabbath
 Achan
 Adoniram, King Rehoboam's tax man
 Naboth,
 Zechariah ben Jehoiada, who denounced the people's disobedience to the commandments (perhaps also )
In the New Testament:
 Saint Stephen, accused of blasphemy c. AD 31.
 Paul the Apostle, stoned at Lystra at the instigation of Jews. He was left for dead, but then revived.
In the Talmud
 Yeshu the Nazarene "will be led out to be stoned" (Sanhedrin 43a)

Averted
In the Tanakh and Old Testament:
 Moses
 Moses, Aaron, Joshua and Caleb
 David

In the New Testament:
 The Gospel of John chapter 8 gives the story of Jesus and the woman taken in adultery, in which people wanted to stone the woman.
 Jesus
 The captain of the Temple and his officers feared that they might be stoned by the people of Jerusalem for preventing the Apostles from preaching about Jesus
 Paul and Barnabas, after provoking a division between believers and non-believers in Iconium

In literature
 Shirley Jackson's "The Lottery" depicts an annual lottery in which one member of a small, isolated American community is ritually stoned to death as a sacrifice. It explores themes of scapegoating, man's inherent evil and the destructive nature of observing ancient, outdated rituals. The music video for "Man That You Fear" by Marilyn Manson is based on the story.
 Robert A. Heinlein's Stranger in a Strange Land reaches its climax with a stoning execution.
 Freidoune Sahebjam's 1990 book La Femme Lapidée is based on the story of a woman who was stoned to death in Iran in 1986. The book was the basis of the 2008 film, The Stoning of Soraya M..
 Simon Perry's All Who Came Before climaxes with a stoning as Barabbas enters Jerusalem.
 Princess: A true story of life behind the veil in Saudi Arabia by Jean Sasson describes a girl sentenced to death by stoning.
 In the 2003 novel The Kite Runner by Khaled Hosseini, a couple are stoned to death at a soccer stadium in Afghanistan.
 In the 2008 novel "The Dark Forest" by Liu Cixin, Wallfacer Rey Diaz was stoned to death by his own people for putting the entire world in danger.
 In the 2021 crime novel "The Stoning" by Peter Papathanasiou, a schoolteacher is taped to a tree and stoned in an outback Australian town.

In film and television
 A Stoning in Fulham County, 1988 – A made-for-TV movie surrounding the vigilante stoning in an American Amish community.
 Monty Python's Life of Brian presents a Jesus of Nazareth-era stoning in a humorous context, ending with a massive boulder being dropped on the Jewish official, not the victim. The film mentions that women are not allowed at stonings, yet almost all of the stone-throwers turn out to be women disguised as men.
 Shirley Jackson's "The Lottery" was made into a short (20 minute) film by Larry Yust in 1969 as part of an educational release for Encyclopædia Britannica's "Short Story Showcase".
 The film The Kite Runner depicts the stoning of an adulteress by the Taliban in a public stadium during a football match.
 The film Mission Istanbul depicts the stoning of an adulteress in Kabul, by the fictional terrorist group Abu Nazir until it is interrupted by the protagonist Vikas Sagar.
 The Stoning of Soraya M., a 2008 film
 Zorba The Greek, a 1946 novel by Nikos Kazantzakis and 1964 movie with Anthony Quinn, has a grim stoning scene where the woman is rescued only to be stabbed at the scene.
 Osama (2003) by director Siddiq Barmak depicts a woman being buried in preparation for stoning.
 In one CSI: Miami 2011 episode a female college bully is murdered by lapidation.
 In Lady Gaga's music video for her song Judas, a scene depicts Gaga being stoned to death.
 Although Islamic law prescribes stoning for married adulterers, the television series Sleeper Cell, about an underground radical Islamist group, depicts a scene where a member is stoned for treason.
 In Spartacus: War of the Damned (2010–13), Season 3, Episode 2, a slave is stoned by the Roman public.
 In Timbuktu (2014), a film about Islamist insurgents in Timbuktu, Mali, a man and woman are depicted buried up to the neck and stoned to death.

See also
 Shab Qadar Incident
 Stoning of the Devil
 Honor killing
 Lynching

Related methods of execution
 Ishikozume (Japan)
 Crushing
 Cement shoes

Individuals
 Malak Ghorbany
 Amina Lawal
 Stoning of Du'a Khalil Aswad

References

External links

 Frequently Asked Questions About Stoning
 Stoning and Human Rights 
 Stoning and Islam 
 Extract of the Kitab Al-Hudud (The book pertaining to punishments prescribed by Islam)
 Khaleej Times  (United Arab Emirates: Fujairah Shariah court orders man to be stoned to death for adultery – 11 June 2006)
 Muslims against stoning
 QuranicPath – Qur'an against stoning
 1991 Video of Stoning of Death in Iran: WMV format | RealPlayer
 Graphic: Anatomy of a stoning (National Post, November 20, 2010)
 Amnesty International 2008, "Campaigning to end stoning in Iran" 

Capital punishment
Execution methods
Torture
Punishments in religion
 
Killings by type